The 2021–22 season was the third in the history of Western United Football Club. In addition to the domestic league, Western United also competed in the FFA Cup for the first time.

They finished third in the regular season and then won the Championship, beating holders Melbourne City in the Grand Final.

Review

Background 
Western United's 2020–21 campaign had seen an eight-game losing streak and a lack of creativity lead to a disappointing tenth-place finish in the league, the club's lowest in their history forcing them to play in the 2021 FFA Cup seventh preliminary round against Newcastle Jets. Three days after their league finish on 8 June 2021, the club parted ways with their head coach Mark Rudan who was their manager since their first season in 2019–20.

Players

First-team squad

Transfers

Transfers in

From youth squad

Transfers out

Contract extensions

Pre-season and friendlies

Competitions

Overview

A-League Men

League table

Results by round

Matches
The league fixtures were announced on 23 September 2021.

 

Notes:

Finals series

FFA Cup

Statistics

Appearances and goals 
Players with no appearances not included in the list.

Disciplinary record
The list is sorted by squad number when total cards are equal. Players with no cards not included in the list.

Clean sheets

See also 
 2021–22 in Australian soccer
 List of Western United FC seasons

References

External links 
 Western United official website

Western United FC seasons
2021–22 A-League Men season by team